Kiladi Ranga is a 1966 Indian Kannada-language film, directed by G. V. Iyer and produced by B. S. Ranga. The film stars Rajkumar, Jayanthi, M. P. Shankar and Narasimharaju. The film has musical score by G. K. Venkatesh. The movie is based on the novel The Prisoner of Zenda by Anthony Hope, which was also later adapted in Hindi as Prem Ratan Dhan Payo in 2015.

Cast
Rajkumar
Jayanthi
M. P. Shankar
Narasimharaju
B. Jayashree
B. V. Radha
Raghavendra Rao
Dinesh
Bangalore Nagesh

Soundtrack
The music was composed by G. K. Venkatesh.

References

External links
 

1966 films
1960s Kannada-language films
Films scored by G. K. Venkatesh
Films directed by G. V. Iyer